The Marlin Model 55 is a large, bolt-action, series of shotguns.  It was produced in 20, 16, 12 and 10 gauge at various times in its production history.  It features a full-choke and a thumb safety.  The shotgun shells are fed via a two-round, detachable, box magazine.

Variants

Model 55 Hunter: The original model, the Model 55 Hunter, was produced from 1954 until 1964 in 12 gauge (1956-1964 in 20 gauge and 1961–1966 in 16 gauge).
Model 55 Goose Gun: The Goose Gun was a 12 gauge that was produced from 1962 until 1988 and it featured a 36" barrel with an overall length of 56¾" and weighed 8 lbs.
Model 55 Swamp Gun: The Swamp Gun was a 12 gauge that was only produced from 1963 to 1965.
Model 55G (Glenfield): The Model 55G (Glenfield) was produced between 1961 and 1965 in 12, 16 and 20 gauges.
Glenfield Model 50: From 1966 until 1973, a slightly shorter variant called the Model 50 was produced.  It differs in that it features a modified-choke, a 28 inch barrel (48¾" overall), and weighs 7½ pounds.
Model 55 Slug Gun: The Model 55 Slug Gun was a 12 gauge produced from 1973 until 1979.
Model 5510 SuperGoose: Another variant called the Model 5510 SuperGoose was produced and chambered for the 10-gauge (3½") cartridge.  The SuperGoose was produced from 1976 to 1985.

References

External links 
Exploded drawing of Model 5510 Supergoose from:
Murtz, Harold A. The Gun Digest Book of Exploded Gun Drawings. Gun Digest, 2005. .

Marlin Firearms Company firearms
Bolt-action shotguns